Diodora arcuata, common name the arcuate limpet, is a species of sea snail, a marine gastropod mollusk in the family Fissurellidae, the keyhole limpets.

Description
The size of the shell varies between 8 mm and 15 mm.

Distribution
Diodora arcuata is found in the western Atlantic Ocean (off the Bahamas and Florida)., in the Gulf of Mexico, the Caribbean Sea and the Lesser Antilles.

References

 Turgeon, D.D., et al. 1998. Common and scientific names of aquatic invertebrates of the United States and Canada. American Fisheries Society Special Publication 26 page(s): 57 
  Rosenberg, G., F. Moretzsohn, and E. F. García. 2009. Gastropoda (Mollusca) of the Gulf of Mexico, pp. 579–699 in Felder, D.L. and D.K. Camp (eds.), Gulf of Mexico–Origins, Waters, and Biota. Biodiversity. Texas A&M Press, College Station, Texas

External links
 

Fissurellidae
Gastropods described in 1862